Verlag Anton Saurwein (Anton Saurwein Publishing) is an independent German academic publishing house specialising in the publication of titles in the field of pre-Columbian Americanist research. Founded in the 1990s by the German Mesoamericanist researcher Anton Saurwein, the publishing company is a prominent producer of European-based research materials and journals in the study of Mesoamerican and Andean cultures and civilizations. 

Formerly based in Möckmühl and latterly in Markt Schwaben, Germany, a town near Munich, Saurwein acquired the publishing rights and duties for Mexicon, one of the premiere academic journals for Mesoamerican research in Europe, from its former publisher Verlag von Flemming. Saurwein also took over from the Flemming company the publication of Acta Mesoamericana, a monographic series of titles that includes the proceedings of the annual European Maya Conferences, organised by the European Association of Mayanists, WAYEB.

References 

Book publishing companies of Germany
Publishing companies of Germany
Academic publishing companies
Publishing companies established in the 1990s